Ambulance Girl is a 2005 made-for-television film starring Kathy Bates and Robin Thomas. It premiered in the United States on September 12, 2005 on the Lifetime network.

The film is based on the memoir by Jane Stern, Ambulance Girl: How I Saved Myself by Becoming an EMT. The teleplay was written by Alan Hines and the film was directed by Kathy Bates.

Kathy Bates plays Jane Stern, a food writer who becomes an Emergency Medical Technician (EMT).

Accolades
Bates received a nomination for the Primetime Emmy Award for Outstanding Lead Actress in a Miniseries or Movie, but lost to Helen Mirren for her role in Elizabeth I. The film received two Prism Award nominations, one for Best Miniseries or TV Movie and the other for Performance in a Miniseries or TV Movie. The film did not win either nomination.

References

External links

2005 television films
2005 films
2005 comedy-drama films
Lifetime (TV network) films
2000s English-language films
Films directed by Kathy Bates
American comedy-drama films
American drama television films
2000s American films